Preston Richard is a civil parish in the South Lakeland District of Cumbria, England. It contains 14 listed buildings that are recorded in the National Heritage List for England.  All the listed buildings are designated at Grade II, the lowest of the three grades, which is applied to "buildings of national importance and special interest".  The parish contains the villages of Endmoor and Crooklands and is otherwise almost entirely rural.  The Lancaster Canal runs through the parish, and the listed buildings associated with this are four bridges, an aqueduct, and a milestone.  The other listed buildings consist of houses and associated structures, farmhouses, a former mill, two road milestones, and a boundary stone.


Buildings

References

Citations

Sources

Lists of listed buildings in Cumbria